The 2019 Big 12 Conference football season represented the 24th season of Big 12 conference football, taking place during the 2019 NCAA Division I FBS football season. The season began with non-conference play on Thursday, August 29, 2019. Conference play began on Saturday, September 21, 2019. The entire schedule was released on October 18, 2018.

The 2019 season eas the eighth for the Big 12 since the early-2010s conference realignment brought the Big 12 membership to its current form.

As a ten–team league, the Big 12 played a nine-game round-robin conference schedule and each member played three non-conference games – one of which must be against a Power Five conference foe. The regular season was followed by a conference championship game played between the regular-season champion and the regular-season runner-up. The 2019 Big 12 Championship Game was held at AT&T Stadium in Arlington, Texas on Saturday, December 7, 2019.

Background

Previous season

Preseason

Recruiting

Big 12 Media Days
The Big 12 media days will be held on July 15–16 in Frisco, Texas.

Preseason poll
The 2019 Big 12 Preseason media poll was released on July 10, 2019. Prior to the Big 12 media days. Oklahoma was chosen to finish at the top of the standings for the fourth consecutive year in the Big 12 football preseason poll, voted on by media representatives.

First place votes in 

Preseason awards
2019 Preseason All-Big 12

Offensive Player of the Year: Sam Ehlinger, Texas
Defensive Player of the Year: Kenneth Murray, Oklahoma
Newcomer of the Year: Jalen Hurts, Oklahoma

Head coaches
There will be 4 new head coaches in the Big 12 Conference for the 2019 season.

On November 4, KU fired coach David Beatty after four years at the school. Two weeks later on November 19, Les Miles was hired as the new head coach of the Jayhawks.

On November 25, Texas Tech fired coach Kliff Kingsbury after six years with the team. Four days later on November 29, Matt Wells from Utah State was hired as the new head coach of the Red Raiders.

On December 2, Bill Snyder retired from the Kansas State Wildcats after 26 years with the school. Nine days later on December 11, Chris Klieman from North Dakota State was named the new head coach of the Wildcats.

On January 1, Dana Holgorsen left West Virginia to become the new head coach of the Houston Cougars. Three days later on January 4, The team hired Neal Brown from the Troy Trojans as the new head coach of the Mountaineers.

Coaches

Schedule
The regular season began on August 30 and will end on November 30.

Regular season

Week One
{| class="wikitable"
|-
! Date !! Conference !! Visitor !! Home !! Site !! Time !! Score
|- style="background:#cfc"
| August 30 || Pac-12 || Oklahoma State || Oregon State || Reser Stadium • Corvallis, OR || 9:30 p.m (FS1) || W, 52–36
|-
|- style="background:#cfc"
| August 31 || MVFC (FCS) || Indiana State || Kansas || David Booth Kansas Memorial Stadium • Lawrence, KS || 11:00 a.m. (FSN) || W, 24–17
|- 
|- style="background:#cfc"
| August 31 || MVFC (FCS) || Northern Iowa || No. 21 Iowa State || Jack Trice Stadium • Ames, IA || 11:00 a.m. (FS1)|| W, 29–26 (3OT)
|-
|- style="background:#cfc"
| August 31 || CAA (FCS) || James Madison || West Virginia || Mountaineer Field • Morgantown, WV || 2:00 p.m. (AT&TSN Pittsburgh) 
| W, 20–13
|-
|- style="background:#cfc"
| August 31 || Big Sky (FCS) || Montana State || Texas Tech || Jones AT&T Stadium • Lubbock, TX || 3:00 p.m. (FSN)
| W 45–10
|- 
|- style="background:#cfc"
| August 31 || Southland (FCS) || Nicholls || Kansas State ||Bill Snyder Family Football Stadium • Manhattan, KS || 6:00 p.m. (ESPN+)
| W 49–14
|- 
|- style="background:#cfc"
| August 31 || Southland (FCS) || Stephen F. Austin || Baylor ||McLane Stadium • Waco, TX || 6:00 p.m. (ESPN+)
| W 56–17
|- 
|- style="background:#cfc"
| August 31 || C-USA || Louisiana  Tech || No. 10 Texas || Darrell K Royal–Texas Memorial Stadium • Austin, TX || 7:00 p.m. (LHN)
| W 45–14
|-
|- style="background:#cfc"
| August 31 || SWAC (FCS) || Arkansas–Pine Bluff || TCU || Amon G. Carter Stadium • Fort Worth, TX || 8:00 p.m. (FSN)
| W 39–7
|-
|- style="background:#cfc"
| September 1 || American || Houston || No. 4 Oklahoma || Gaylord Family Oklahoma Memorial Stadium • Norman, OK || 6:30 p.m. (ABC)
| W 49-31
|-

Week Two
{| class="wikitable"
|-
! Date !! Conference !! Visitor !! Home !! Site !! Time !! Score
|- style="background:#cfc"
| September 7 || MAC || Bowling Green || Kansas State || Bill Snyder Family Stadium • Manhattan, KS || 11:00 a.m (FSN) || W, 52–0
|-
|- style="background:#fcc"
| September 7 || SEC || West Virginia || Missouri || Faurot Field • Columbia, MO || 11:00 a.m. (ESPN2) || L, 7–38
|-
|- style="background:#cfc"
| September 7 || C-USA || UTSA || Baylor || McLane Stadium • Waco, TX || 3:00 p.m. (FSN) || W, 63-14
|-
|- style="background:#fcc"
| September 7 || Sun Belt || Coastal Carolina || Kansas || David Booth Kansas Memorial Stadium • Lawrence, KS || 6:00 p.m. (ESPN+) || L, 7-12
|- 
|- style="background:#cfc"
| September 7 || Southland (FCS) || McNeese State || Oklahoma State ||Boone Pickens Stadium • Stillwater, OK || 6:00 p.m. (ESPN+) || W, 56–14
|- 
|- style="background:#cfc"
| September 7|| MVFC (FCS) || South Dakota || Oklahoma ||Gaylord Family Oklahoma Memorial Stadium • Norman, OK || 6:00 p.m. (FSN OK) || W, 70–14
|- 
|- style="background:#fcc"
| September 7 || SEC || No. 6 LSU || No. 9 Texas || Darrell K Royal–Texas Memorial Stadium • Austin, TX || 6:30 p.m. (ABC)
| L, 38–45
|-
|- style="background:#cfc"
| September 7 || C-USA || UTEP || Texas Tech || Jones AT&T Stadium • Lubbock, TX || 7:00 p.m. (FSN)
| W 38–3
|-

Week Three
{| class="wikitable"
|-
! Date !! Conference !! Visitor !! Home !! Site !! Time !! Score
|- style="background:#bfb"
| September 13 || ACC || Kansas || Boston College || Alumni Stadium • Chestnut Hill, MA || 6:30 p.m. (ACCN) || W 48–24
|-
|- style="background:#bfb"
| September 14 || SEC || Kansas State || Mississippi State || Davis Wade Stadium • Starkville, MS || 11:00 a.m. (ESPN/ESPN2) || W 31–24
|-
|- style="background:#bfb"
| September 14 || ACC || North Carolina State || West Virginia || Mountaineer Field • Morgantown, WV || 11:00 a.m. (FS1)
| W 44–27
|- 
|- style="background:#bfb"
| September 14 || American || Oklahoma State || Tulsa || Skelly Field at H. A. Chapman Stadium • Tulsa, OK (Rivalry) || 2:30 p.m. (ABC/ESPN/ESPN2) 
| W 40–21
|- 
|- style="background:#fbb"
| September 14 || Big Ten ||No. 19 Iowa || Iowa State || Jack Trice Stadium • Ames, IA || 3:00 p.m. (FS1)
| L 17–18 
|- 
|- style="background:#bfb"
| September 14 || Big Ten || TCU || Purdue || Ross–Ade Stadium • West Lafayette, IN || 6:30 p.m. (BTN)
| W 34–13
|- 
|- style="background:#bfb"
| September 14 || C-USA || No. 12 Texas || Rice || NRG Stadium • Houston, TX (Rivalry) || 7:00 p.m. (CBSSN)
| W 48–13
|-  
|- style="background:#bfb"
| September 14 || Pac-12 || No. 5 Oklahoma || UCLA || Rose Bowl • Pasadena, CA || 7:00 p.m. (FOX)
| W 48–14
|-
|- style="background:#fbb"
| September 14 || Pac-12 || Texas Tech || Arizona || Arizona Stadium • Tucson, AZ || 9:30 p.m. (ESPN)
| L 14–28
|-

Week Four
{| class="wikitable"
|-
! Date !! Conference !! Visitor !! Home !! Site !! Time !! Score
|- style="background:#bfb"
| September 21 || Sun Belt || Louisiana–Monroe || Iowa State || Jack Trice Stadium • Ames, IA || 11:00 a.m. (FS1) 
| W 72–20
|-
|- style="background:#fbb"
| September 21 || American || SMU || No. 25 TCU || Amon G. Carter Stadium • Fort Worth, TX (Rivalry) || 2:30 p.m. (FS1) 
| L 38–41
|- 
|- style="background:white"
| September 21 || -- || West Virginia || Kansas || David Booth Kansas Memorial Stadium • Lawrence, KS || 3:30 p.m. (ESPN+)
| WVU 29–24
|-
|- style="background:#bfb"
| September 21 || C-USA || Baylor || Rice || Rice Stadium • Houston, TX ||6:00 p.m. (CBSSN)
| W 21–13
|-   
|- style="background:white"
| September 21 || -- || Oklahoma State || No. 12 Texas || Darrell K Royal–Texas Memorial Stadium • Austin, TX || 6:30 p.m. (ABC) || TEX 36–30
|-

Week Five
{| class="wikitable"
|-
! Date !! Conference !! Visitor !! Home !! Site !! Time !! Score
|- style="background:white"
| September 28 || -- || Texas Tech || No. 6 Oklahoma || Gaylord Family Oklahoma Memorial Stadium • Norman, OK || 11:00 a.m. (FOX) 
| OU 55–16
|- 
|- style="background:white"
| September 28 || -- || Kansas || TCU || Amon G. Carter Stadium • Fort Worth, TX || 11:00 a.m. (FS1) 
| TCU 51–14
|-
|- style="background:white"
| September 28 || -- || Iowa State || Baylor || McLane Stadium • Waco, TX || 2:30 p.m. (ESPN)
| BAY 23–21
|- 
|- style="background:white"
| September 28 || -- || Kansas State || Oklahoma State || Boone Pickens Stadium • Stillwater, OK || 6:00 p.m. (ESPN+)
| OKSU 26–13
|-

Week Six
{| class="wikitable"
|-
! Date !! Conference !! Visitor !! Home !! Site !! Time !! Score
|- style="background:white"
| October 5 || -- || No. 6 Oklahoma || Kansas || David Booth Kansas Memorial Stadium • Lawrence, KS || 11:00 a.m. (ABC)
| OKLA 45–20
|-
|- style="background:white"
| October 5 || -- || TCU || Iowa State || Jack Trice Stadium • Ames, IA || 11:00 a.m. (ESPN2) 
| ISU 49–24
|- 
|- style="background:white"
| October 5 || -- || No. 21 Oklahoma State || Texas Tech || Jones AT&T Stadium • Lubbock, TX (Rivalry) || 11:00 a.m. (FS1)
| TTU 45–35
|-
|- style="background:white"
| October 5 || -- || No. 11 Texas || West Virginia || Mountaineer Field • Morgantown, WV || 2:30 p.m. (ABC) || TEX 42–31
|-   
|- style="background:white"
| October 5 || -- || Baylor || Kansas State || Billy Snyder Family Football Stadium • Manhattan, KS || 2:30 p.m. (ESPN2)
| BAY 31–12
|-

Week Seven

{| class="wikitable"
|-
! Date !! Conference !! Visitor !! Home !! Site !! Time !! Score
|- style="background:white"
| October 12 || -- || No. 6 Oklahoma || No. 11 Texas || Cotton Bowl • Dallas, TX (Red River Showdown) || 11:00 a.m. (FOX) 
|OKLA 34-27
|-
|- style="background:white"
| October 12 || -- || Texas Tech || No. 22 Baylor || McLane Stadium • Waco, TX (Rivalry) || 3:00 p.m. (FS1)
| BAY 33-30
|- 
|- style="background:white"
| October 12 || -- || Iowa State || West Virginia || Mountaineer Field • Morgantown, WV || 3:00 p.m. (ESPN) 
| ISU 38-14
|-

Week Eight
{| class="wikitable"
|-
! Date !! Conference !! Visitor !! Home !! Site !! Time !! Score
|- style="background:white"
| October 19 || -- || West Virginia || No. 5 Oklahoma || Gaylord Family Oklahoma Memorial Stadium • Norman, OK || 11:00 a.m. (FOX) 
|OKLA 52-14
|-
|- style="background:white"
| October 19 || -- || Iowa State || Texas Tech || Jones AT&T Stadium • Lubbock, TX || 11:00 a.m. (FS1)
|ISU 34-24  
|- 
|- style="background:white"
| October 19 || -- || TCU || Kansas State || Bill Snyder Family Football Stadium • Manhattan, KS || 1:30 p.m. (FSN)
|KSU 24-17
|- 
|- style="background:white"
| October 19 || -- || No. 18 Baylor || Oklahoma State || Boone Pickens Stadium • Stillwater, OK || 3:00 p.m. (FOX)
|BAY 45-27
|-
|- style="background:white"
| October 19 || -- || Kansas || No. 15 Texas || Darrell K Royal–Texas Memorial Stadium • Austin, TX || 6:00 p.m. (LHN)
|TEX 50-48
|-

Week Nine
{| class="wikitable"
|-
! Date !! Conference !! Visitor !! Home !! Site !! Time !! Score
|- style="background:white"
| October 26 || -- || No. 5 Oklahoma || Kansas State || Bill Snyder Family Football Stadium • Manhattan, KS || 11:00 AM (ABC)
| KSU 48–41
|-
|- style="background:white"
| October 26 || -- || Oklahoma State || No. 23 Iowa State || Jack Trice Stadium • Ames, IA || 2:30 PM (FS1)
| OKSU 34–27
|- 
|- style="background:white"
| October 26 || -- || No. 15 Texas || TCU || Amon G. Carter Stadium • Fort Worth, TX || 2:30 PM (FOX) 
| TCU 37–27
|- 
|- style="background:white"
| October 26 || -- || Texas Tech || Kansas || David Booth Kansas Memorial Stadium • Lawrence, KS || 6:00 PM (FS1)
| KAN 37–34
|-

Week Ten

{| class="wikitable"
|-
! Date !! Conference !! Visitor !! Home !! Site !! Time !! Score
|- style="background:white"
| October 31 || -- || West Virginia || No. 12 Baylor || McLane Stadium • Waco, TX || 7:00 p.m. (ESPN) 
| BAY 17–14
|-
|- style="background:white"
| November 2 || -- || No. 22 Kansas State || Kansas || David Booth Kansas Memorial Stadium • Lawrence, KS (Sunflower Showdown) || 2:30 p.m. (FS1)
| KSU 38–10
|- 
|- style="background:white"
| November 2 || -- || TCU || Oklahoma State || Boone Pickens Stadium • Stillwater, OK || 2:30 p.m. (ESPN) 
| OKSU 34–27
|-

Week Eleven
{| class="wikitable"
|-
! Date !! Conference !! Visitor !! Home !! Site !! Time !! Score 
|- style="background:white"
| November 9 || -- || No. 11 Baylor || TCU || Amon G. Carter Stadium • Fort Worth, TX (Rivalry) || 11:00 a.m. (FS1) 
| BAY 29–23 (3OT)
|- 
|- style="background:white"
| November 9 || -- || Texas Tech || West Virginia || Mountaineer Field • Morgantown, WV || 11:00 a.m. (ESPN2) 
| TTU 38–17
|-
|- style="background:white"
| November 9 || -- || No. 20 Kansas State || Texas || Darrell K Royal–Texas Memorial Stadium • Austin, TX || 2:30 p.m. (ESPN) 
| TEX 27–24
|-   
|- style="background:white"
| November 9 || -- || Iowa State || No. 9 Oklahoma || Gaylord Family Oklahoma Memorial Stadium • Norman, OK || 7:00 p.m. (FOX) 
| OKLA 42–41
|-

Week Twelve

{| class="wikitable"
|-
! Date !! Conference !! Visitor !! Home !! Site !! Time !! Score
|- style="background:white"
| November 16 || -- || Kansas || Oklahoma State || Boone Pickens Stadium • Stillwater, OK || 11:00 a.m. (FS1) 
| OKSU 31–13
|-
|- style="background:white"
| November 16 || -- || TCU || Texas Tech || Amon G. Carter Stadium • Fort Worth, TX (Rivalry) || 11:00 a.m. (ESPN2) || TCU 33–31
|-   
|- style="background:white"
| November 16 || -- || No. 22 Texas || Iowa State || Jack Trice Stadium • Ames, IA || 2:30 p.m. (FS1) 
| ISU 23–21
|- 
|- style="background:white"
| November 16 || -- || West Virginia || Kansas State || Bill Snyder Family Football Stadium • Manhattan, KS || 2:30 p.m. (ESPN)
| WVU 24–20
|-
|- style="background:white"
| November 16 || -- || No. 10 Oklahoma || No. 12 Baylor || McLane Stadium • Waco, TX || 6:30 p.m. (ABC)
| OKLA 34–31

Week Thirteen

{| class="wikitable"
|-

! Date !! Conference !! Visitor !! Home !! Site !! Time !! Score
|- style="background:white"
| November 23 || -- || No. 21 Oklahoma State || West Virginia || Mountaineer Field • Morgantown, WV || 11:00 a.m. (ESPN 2) || OKSU 20–13
|-   
|- style="background:white"
| November 23 || -- || Kansas || No. 22 Iowa State || Jack Trice Stadium • Ames, IA || 11:00 a.m. (FSN) 
| ISU 41–31
|-  
|- style="background:white"
| November 23 || -- || Texas || Baylor || McLane Stadium • Waco, TX ||
2:30 p.m
(FS1)
| BAY 24–10
|-  
|- style="background:white"
| November 23 || -- || Kansas State || Texas Tech || Jones AT&T Stadium • Lubbock, TX || 6:00 p.m. (FS1)
| KSU 30–27
|- 
|- style="background:white"
| November 23 || -- || TCU || No. 9 Oklahoma || Gaylord Family Oklahoma Memorial Stadium • Norman, OK ||7:00 p.m. (FOX) 
| OKLA 28–24
|-

Week Fourteen

{| class="wikitable"
|-
! Date !! Conference !! Visitor !! Home !! Site !! Time !! Score
|- style="background:white"
| November 29 || -- || Texas Tech || Texas || Darrell K Royal–Texas Memorial Stadium • Austin, TX (Rivalry) || 11:00 a.m. (FOX) || TEX 49–24
|-   
|- style="background:white"
| November 29 || -- || West Virginia || TCU || Amon G. Carter Stadium • Fort Worth, TX || 2:15 p.m. (ESPN) 
| WVU 20–17
|-  
|- style="background:white"
| November 30 || -- || No. 9 Baylor || Kansas || David Booth Kansas Memorial Stadium • Lawrence, KS || 2:30 p.m. (ESPN)
| BAY 61–6
|-
|- style="background:white"
| November 30 || -- || No. 23 Iowa State || Kansas State || Bill Snyder Family Football Stadium • Manhattan, KS (Rivalry) || 6:00 p.m. (FS1)
| KSU 27–17
|- 
|- style="background:white"
| November 30 || -- || No. 7 Oklahoma || Oklahoma State || Boone Pickens Stadium • Stillwater, OK (Bedlam Series) || 7:00 p.m. (FOX) 
| OKLA 34–16

Championship Game

Big 12 vs other conferences

Big 12 vs Power 5 matchups

Big 12 vs Group of Five matchups
The following games include Big 12 teams competing against teams from the American, C-USA, MAC, Mountain West or Sun Belt.

Big 12 vs FBS independents matchups
The following games include Big 12 teams competing against FBS Independents, which includes Army, Liberty, New Mexico State, or UMass. The Big 12 counts games against the other two FBS independents, BYU and Notre Dame, as satisfying its requirement that Big 12 members play at least one Power Five non-conference opponent.

Big 12 vs FCS matchups

Records against other conferencesRegular SeasonPost SeasonRankings

Postseason
Bowl games

Rankings are from CFP rankings.  All times Central Time Zone. Big 12 teams shown in bold.

Selection of teamsBowl eligible: Baylor, Iowa State, Kansas State, Oklahoma, Oklahoma State, TexasBowl-ineligible: Kansas, TCU, Texas Tech, West Virginia

Awards and honors
Player of the week honors

Big 12 Individual Awards
The following individuals received postseason honors as voted by the Big 12 Conference football coaches at the end of the season.

All-conference teams

*Denotes Unanimous SelectionAll Conference Honorable Mentions:Baylor: Charlie Brewer (QB & OPoY), JaMycal Hasty (RB), Jameson Houston (DB), James Lockhart (DL), Blake Lynch (LB), Xavier Newman-Johnson (OL), Tyquan Thornton (WR)
Iowa State: Trevor Downing (OL), Julian Good-Jones (OLoY), Breece Hall (OFoY), Anthony Johnson (DB), Jamahl Johnson (DL), Josh Knipfel (OL), Tayvonn Kyle (DFoY), La’Michael Pettway (WR & ONoY), Brock Purdy (OPoY), Mike Rose (LB), Dylan Soehner (FB), Marcel Spears Jr. (LB), Eyioma Uwazurike (DL), O’Rien Vance (LB), Lawrence White (DB), Steven Wirtel (STPoY)
Kansas: Hakeem Adeniji (OLoY), Jelani Brown (DL), Hasan Defense (DB), Azur Kamara (DL), Mike Lee (DB), Ben Miles (FB), Andrew Parchment (WR & ONoY), Gavin Potter (DFoY), Kyle Thompson (P)
K-State: James Gilbert (RB), Denzel Goolsby (DB), Adam Holtorf (OL), Wyatt Hubert (DPoY & DLoY), Nick Kaltmayer (OL), Malik Knowles (OFoY), Blake Lynch (PK), A. J. Parker(DB), Dalton Schoen (WR), Elijah Sullivan (LB), Skylar Thompson (QB), Reggie Walker (DL)
Oklahoma: Gabe Brkic (STPoY), Pat Fields (DB), Neville Gallimore (DLoY), Jalen Hurts (OPoY), CeeDee Lamb (KR/PR & OPoY), Reeves Mundschau (P), Kenneth Murray (DPoY), Jalen Redmond (DL & DFoY), Delarrin Turner-Yell (DB), DaShaun White (LB)
Oklahoma State: Matt Ammendola (PK & STPoY), Israel Antwine (DL & DNoY), Trace Ford (DL & DFoY), A. J. Green (DB), Kolby Harvell-Peel (DPoY), Tom Hutton (P), Teven Jenkins (OL), Marcus Keyes (OL), Tre Sterling (DB), Dillon Stoner (WR & KR/PR), Johnny Wilson (OL), Jelani Woods (TE)
TCU: Darius Anderson (RB), Taye Barber (WR), Corey Bethley (DL), Ross Blacklock (DLoY), Max Duggan (OFoY), Cordel Iwuagwu (OL), Jonathan Song (STPoY), Garret Wallow (DPoY)
Texas:	Parker Braun (ONoY), Sam Cosmi (OLoY), Cameron Dicker (PK), Devin Duvernay (OPoY), Sam Ehlinger (QB), Joseph Ossai (LB), Malcolm Roach (DL)
Texas Tech: Jordyn Brooks (DPoY), Dawson Deaton (OL), DaMarcus Fields (DB), Riko Jeffers (LB), Terence Steele (OL), Donta Thompson (TE), SaRodorick Thompson (RB), RJ Turner (ONoY), Broderick Washington Jr. (DL), Trey Wolff (PK)
West Virginia:	Josh Chandler (LB), Josh Growden (STPoY), Sam James (WR & OFoY), Tykee Smith (DFoY), Darius Stills (DLoY)

All-Americans

The 2019 College Football All-America Teams are composed of the following College Football All-American first teams chosen by the following selector organizations: Associated Press (AP), Football Writers Association of America (FWAA), American Football Coaches Association (AFCA), Walter Camp Foundation (WCFF), The Sporting News (TSN), Sports Illustrated (SI), USA Today (USAT) ESPN, CBS Sports (CBS), FOX Sports (FOX) College Football News (CFN), Bleacher Report (BR), Scout.com, Phil Steele (PS), SB Nation (SB), Athlon Sports, Pro Football Focus (PFF) and Yahoo! Sports (Yahoo!).

Currently, the NCAA compiles consensus all-America teams in the sports of Division I-FBS football and Division I men's basketball using a point system computed from All-America teams named by coaches associations or media sources.  The system consists of three points for a first-team honor, two points for second-team honor, and one point for third-team honor.  Honorable mention and fourth team or lower recognitions are not accorded any points.  Football consensus teams are compiled by position and the player accumulating the most points at each position is named first team consensus all-American.  Currently, the NCAA recognizes All-Americans selected by the AP, AFCA, FWAA, TSN'', and the WCFF to determine Consensus and Unanimous All-Americans. Any player named to the First Team by all five of the NCAA-recognized selectors is deemed a Unanimous All-American.2018 Consensus All-America Team

*AFCA All-America Team (AFCA)
*Walter Camp Football Foundation All-America Team (WCFF)
*Associated Press All-America Team (AP)
*The Sporting News All-America Team (TSN)
*Football Writers Association of America All-America Team (FWAA)
*Sports Illustrated All-America Team (SI)
*Bleacher Report All-America Team (BR)
*College Football News All-America Team (CFN)
*ESPN All-America Team (ESPN)
*CBS Sports All-America Team (CBS)
*Athlon Sports All-America Team (Athlon)

All-Academic

National award winners
2019 College Football Award Winners

Home game attendanceBold''' – Exceed capacity
†Season High
‡ Record Stadium Attendance

NFL Draft
The following list includes all Big 12 players who were drafted in the 2020 NFL draft.

References